Birchwood Airport  is a state-owned public-use airport located two nautical miles (4 km) northwest of the central business district of Birchwood (also known as Chugiak), in the Anchorage Municipality of the U.S. state of Alaska.

As per Federal Aviation Administration records, the airport had 450 passenger boardings (enplanements) in calendar year 2010, an increase of 20% from the 375 enplanements in 2009. This airport is included in the FAA's National Plan of Integrated Airport Systems for 2011–2015, which categorized it as a general aviation airport.

Facilities and aircraft 
Birchwood Airport covers an area of 196 acres (79 ha) at an elevation of 83 feet (25 m) above mean sea level. It has two runways: 1L/19R is 4,008 by 100 feet (1,222 x 30 m) with an asphalt surface; 1R/19L is 1,802 by 50 feet (549 x 15 m) with an asphalt and gravel surface. There are 292 aircraft based at this airport: 94% single-engine, 2% multi-engine, 1% helicopter, 1% glider, and 2% ultralight.

References

External links 
 FAA Alaska airport diagram (GIF)
 Aerial image as of 4 September 1996 from USGS The National Map

Airports in Anchorage, Alaska